The  grey-capped flycatcher (Myiozetetes granadensis) is a passerine bird, a member of the large tyrant flycatcher family.

It breeds in cultivation, pasture, and open woodland with some trees from eastern Honduras south to northwestern Peru,  northern Bolivia and western Brazil

The nest, built by the female in a bush, tree or on a building, is a large roofed structure of stems and straw, which for protection is often built near a wasp, bee or ant nest, or the nest of another tyrant flycatcher, such as the similar social flycatcher, Myiozetetes similis. The nest site is often near or over water. The typical clutch is two to four brown or lilac-blotched dull white eggs, laid between February and June.

In appearance the grey-capped flycatcher resembles the social flycatcher, which shares much of its range. The adult grey-capped flycatcher is 16.5–18 cm long and weighs 26-30 g. The head is grey with a short weak eyestripe and, in the male, a concealed vermilion crown stripe. The upperparts are olive-brown, and the wings and tail are brown with only faint rufous fringes. The underparts are yellow and the throat is white. Young birds have no crown stripe, and have chestnut fringes to the wing and tail feathers. The best distinction from the social flycatcher is the latter's strong black-and white head pattern.

The call is a sharp nasal kip and the dawn song is a  kip, kip, kip, k’beer.

Grey-capped flycatchers sally out from an open perch in a tree to catch insects in flight. They sometimes hover to take small berries.

References

Further reading

grey-capped flycatcher
Birds of Nicaragua
Birds of Costa Rica
Birds of Panama
Birds of Colombia
Birds of Ecuador
Birds of the Peruvian Amazon
Birds of the Venezuelan Amazon
Birds of the Bolivian Amazon
Birds of the Amazon Basin
grey-capped flycatcher
grey-capped flycatcher